The El Real Retiro (also known as the Handley House) is a Spanish Colonial Revival house in New Smyrna Beach, Florida, United States. Built in 1923 it is located at 636 North Riverside Drive and 647 Faulkner Street. On November 10, 1987, it was added to the U.S. National Register of Historic Places.

It was built for millionaire stockbroker and art collector Robert Handley; the dining room was painted with murals by artist Robert E. Locher depicting the history of the colonization of Florida.

References and external links

 Volusia County listings at National Register of Historic Places
 Volusia County listings at Florida's Office of Cultural and Historical Programs

Houses on the National Register of Historic Places in Volusia County, Florida
Spanish Colonial Revival architecture in Florida
Buildings and structures in New Smyrna Beach, Florida